Taylor Aronson (born December 30, 1991) is an American professional ice hockey defenseman. He is currently an unrestricted free agent who most recently played with Kölner Haie in the Deutsche Eishockey Liga (DEL). Aronson was selected by the Nashville Predators in the 3rd round (78th overall) of the 2010 NHL Entry Draft.

Playing career
Aronson played junior hockey with the Portland Winterhawks in the Western Hockey League. On December 28, 2010, he was signed to the  Nashville Predators on a three-year entry-level contract.

After five seasons within the Predators organization, primarily with American Hockey League affiliate, the Milwaukee Admirals. In 2016, Aronson abandoned his team before playoffs because he did not get called up to the Predators.

He agreed to a one-year contract with a Russian club, HC Lada Togliatti of the Kontinental Hockey League (KHL) on May 23, 2016. 

Aronson moved and played in two successful seasons establishing himself in the DEL with the Thomas Sabo Ice Tigers. At the conclusion of his contract with the Ice Tigers, Aronson secured a one-year contract to remain in Germany, signing with Kölner Haie on May 8, 2019.

Career statistics

References

External links

1991 births
Living people
American men's ice hockey defensemen
Cincinnati Cyclones (ECHL) players
Kölner Haie players
HC Lada Togliatti players
Milwaukee Admirals players
Nashville Predators draft picks
Portland Winterhawks players
Thomas Sabo Ice Tigers players
Ice hockey players from California